The 2022 U Sports Men's Final 8 Basketball Tournament was held April 1–3, 2022, in Edmonton, Alberta, to determine a national champion for the 2021–22 U Sports men's basketball season.

Despite an undefeated regular season (12-0), the defending champion Carleton Ravens entered the tournament ranked seventh, following a loss in the Ontario provincial semi-final game (OUA East final) to the Queen's Gaels. However, the Ravens overcame three teams in this tournament to claim their 16th national title — their third straight crown, 10th of the last 11, and 16th of the last 19. They remain the winningest top division school in Canada or the United States.

Host
The tournament was hosted by the University of Alberta for the first time in school history, and played at the Saville Community Sports Centre. This marks the only time the tournament has been held in Edmonton in the 59 years it’s been contested, and the fifth time in Alberta (the other four were in Calgary). This year's tournament was originally scheduled for March 10 to March 13, 2022, but was delayed three weeks due to ongoing pandemic issues.

Participating teams

Championship bracket

Consolation bracket

References

External links 
 Tournament Web Site

2021–22 in Canadian basketball
U Sports Men's Basketball Championship
University of Alberta